The women's team event at the 2000 Summer Olympics in Sydney, Australia, took place at the Sydney International Aquatic Centre from 28 to 29 September. The Russian synchronized swimmers (led by duet champions Olga Brusnikina and Maria Kisseleva) performed a witch-themed routine with a variety of flying lifts and multiple pattern changes to score 99.146 out of a possible 100 points for an Olympic gold medal in the team event. The Japanese squad excelled in the artistic impression component for a score of 40 in the final free routine, but had to be satisfied with a second Olympic silver at these Games, having received an overall total of 98.860. Meanwhile, the Canadian octet snatched the bronze with a composite score of 97.357, finishing ahead of France by almost a full point (96.467). The U.S. team failed to collect an Olympic medal for the first time since the sport's introduction in 1984, as the swimmers finished the routine in fifth at 96.467.

Eight teams competed, each consisting of eight swimmers (from a total team of nine swimmers). There was a single round of competition. Each team presents two routines: a technical routine and a free routine. The technical routine consists of twelve required elements, which must be completed in order and within a time of between 2 minutes 35 seconds and 3 minutes 5 seconds. The free routine has no restrictions other than time; this routine must last between 3 minutes 45 seconds and 4 minutes 15 seconds.

For each routine, the team is judged by two panels of five judges each. One panel is the technical jury, the other is the artistic jury. Each judge gives marks of between 0 and 10. The highest and lowest score from each panel are dropped, leaving a total of six scores which are then summed to give the routine's score. The scores of the two routines are then added to give a final score for the team.

Schedule 
All times are Australia Standard Time (UTC+11)

Results

References

External links
Official Olympic Report

2000
2000 in women's sport
Women's events at the 2000 Summer Olympics